Vandadeh Rural District is a rural district (dehestan) in Meymeh District, Shahin Shahr and Meymeh County, Isfahan Province, Iran. At the 2006 census, its population was 5,756, in 1,752 families.  The rural district has 11 villages.

References 

Rural Districts of Isfahan Province
Shahin Shahr and Meymeh County